Walter During (born 1960) is a Sierra Leonean sprinter. He competed in the men's 200 metres at the 1980 Summer Olympics.

References

1960 births
Living people
Athletes (track and field) at the 1980 Summer Olympics
Sierra Leonean male sprinters
Olympic athletes of Sierra Leone
Place of birth missing (living people)